The Bengal Pilot Service (BPS) was an arm of the British East India Company (EIC). Its pilot boats were responsible for guiding East Indiamen, and other vessels, up and down the Hooghly River between Calcutta and the sea. The BPS vessels and their role were transferred to the Indian Navy in 1834.

The information in the tables below comes primarily from Phipps (designated with a "†"), or Hackman (designated with a "‡"). The vessels listed are those one source or the other identified as serving the Bengal Pilot Service. Where the two sources disagree with respect to some datum such as year of launch, or burthen, the first datum mentioned is from Phipps and the second is from Hackman.

A & B

C

D — G

H & I
{| class="sortable wikitable"
|-
! Name
! Type
! Tons burthen (bm)
! Year built
! Where built
! Remarks
|-
| Haldane†
| Schooner
| 163
| 1797
| Fort William
| Sold 28 June 1816; possibly sold at Port Jackson 1821 
|-
| Harland†
|
| 132
| 1772
| Bombay Dockyard
| Dispatched to sea October 1776 and lost
|-
| Harriett†
| Agent vessel
| 70
| 1795
| Calcutta
| Sold into the country service
|-
| †
| 
| 150
| 1796
| Calcutta
| The  French privateer Apollon, Captain Jean-François Hodoul, captured her on 9 November 1797 off Sand Heads (equally, Balasore Roads). Harrington arrived at Mauritius on 21 December. The same privateer also captured Trial that same day.
|-
| Hastings†‡
| Schooner
| 170
| 1787, or 1785
| Bombay Dockyard
| Converted to a buoy vessel May 1818; sold to local buyers 11 October 1820. A fire destroyed her in the night on 17 April 1823 while she was at Pulau Pasang, off Padang.
|-
| Hattrass† (or Hatras)
| 
| 197
| 1819
| Kidderpore
| Still in BPS in 1851
|-
| Hawk†
|
| 180
| 1778
| Batavia
| Sold March 1783
|-
| Hawke‡
| Sloop
|
| 1749
| Bombay Dockyard
| 
|-
| Hawke‡
| Gallivat
|
| 1773
| Bombay Dockyard
| 
|-
| Hay†
|
| 150
| 1796
| Calcutta
| On 21 December 1796 the French privateer Enterprise captured her in Balasore Roads. 
|-
| Henry Meriton†‡
| Brig
| 190
| 1817
| Bombay Dockyard
| Sold 1838 to local buyers and renamed William
|-
| Hertford†‡
| Sloop
|
| 1752
| Pegu
| Sold 1 July 1767
|-
| Hope†
| Light vessel
| 180
| 1834
| Howrah
| Stationed at the Sand Heads. In 1842 she caught fire whilst at Saugor, but was saved. There was suspicion against some of the crew. Still in BPS in 1851.
|-
| Hooghly†‡ (or (Hooghli, or Houghley)
| Schooner
| 130, or 147, or 150
| 1794
| Bombay Dockyard
Lost.
|-
| Hughley Anna‡
| Ketch
|
| 1705
|
| 
|-
| Hunter‡
| Schooner
|
| 1758
|
|
|-
| Indus (later Industry†‡
| Schooner
| 140
| 1776
| Bombay Dockyard
| Taken by the French 1782
|-
| Intelligence†
| Schooner
| 160
| 1780
| Calcutta
| Transferred to the Fort Marlborough Residency 1782
|-
|}

J — M

N — R

S — W

Notes, citations and references
Notes

Citations

References
 
 Austen, H.C.M. (1935) Sea Fights and Corsairs of the Indian Ocean: Being the Naval History of Mauritius from 1715 to 1810. (Port Louis, Mauritius: R.W. Brooks).
Clark, F. Compiler (1851) The East-India Register and Army List for 1851. (London:Wm. H. Allen).
 
East India Company (1959) Fort William: India House Correspondence and Other Contemporary Papers Relating Thereto (foreign, Political, and Secret). (National Archives of India).
Falconer, Hugh (1852) Report on the Teak Forests of the Tenasserim Provinces: With Other Papers on the Teak Forests of IndiaFort William-India House Correspondence and Other Contemporary Papers Relating Thereto (1981) (Manager of Publications).
 
 New Oriental Register and East-India directory for 1802 (1802). (Black's & Parry).
 
 Selections from the Calcutta Gazettes of the Years 1874 'to 1932, Inclusive' Showing the Political and Social Condition of the English in India Eighty Years Ago''. (1865).

Ships of the British East India Company